Béguédo is a town and seat of the Béguédo Department of Boulgou Province in south-eastern Burkina Faso. It is located on the highway route N17. As of 2019, the town has a population of 21,894.  One of the six branches of the Banque Atlantique in Burkina Faso is located in Béguédo.

References

Populated places in the Centre-Est Region
Boulgou Province